Jinju Hyong clan is one of the Korean clans. Their Bon-gwan is in Jinju, South Gyeongsang Province. According to the research held in 2000, the number of Jinju Hyong clan’s member was 6277. Their founder was  who was dispatched and was settled in Pyongyang as one of Hanlin Academy during Emperor Taizong of Tang’s reign to respond the request from Yeongnyu of Goguryeo. After Hyeong Gong mi became Prince of Jinju, Hyeong Gong mi founded Jinju Hyong clan and made Jinju, Jinju Hyong clan’s Bon-gwan.

See also 
 Korean clan names of foreign origin

References

External links 
 

 
Korean clan names of Chinese origin
Hyeong clans